The 12325 / 12326 Gurumukhi Superfast Express is an Express train of the Indian Railways connecting  in West Bengal and  in Punjab. It is currently being operated with 12325/12326 train numbers on once in week basis.

Service

The 12325/Gurumukhi SF Express has an average speed of 56 km/hr and covers 1806 km in 32 hrs 20 mins. 12325/Gurumukhi SF Express has an average speed of 56 km/hr and covers 1806 km in 32 hrs 20 mins.

Route & Halts 

The important halts of the train are :

Traction

As the route is fully electrified, it is hauled by a Howrah Loco Shed-based WAP-4 / WAP-7 locomotive from Kolkata to Nangal Dam, and vice versa.

Rake sharing & Maintenance 

The train is maintained by the Kolkata Coaching Depot. The same rake is used for 13137/13138 Kolkata–Azamgarh Weekly Express for one way which is altered by the second rake on the other way.

Coach composition

The train consists of 15 ICF coach:

 1 AC II Tier
 1 AC III Tier
 5 Sleeper coaches
 4 General
 2 Second-class Luggage/parcel van

References

External links 

 12325/Gurumukhi SF Express
 12326/Gurumukhi SF Express

Rail transport in Punjab, India
Rail transport in Haryana
Rail transport in Uttar Pradesh
Rail transport in Bihar
Rail transport in West Bengal
Express trains in India
Transport in Kolkata
Named passenger trains of India